Athletics was contested at the 2019 Summer Universiade from July 8 to 13 at the Stadio San Paolo in Naples, Italy.

Medal summary

Men's events

Women's events

Medal table

Participating nations

References

External links
2019 Summer Universiade Napoli − Athletics
Technical book – Athletics
Results book – Athletics (Archived version)

 
Universiade
Athletics
2019
2019 Summer Universiade